The Accusers is a 2003 historical mystery crime novel by Lindsey Davis and the 15th book of the Marcus Didius Falco Mysteries series. Set in  Ancient Rome between Autumn AD 75 and Spring AD 76, the novel stars Marcus Didius Falco, informer and imperial agent. The title refers to the role of accusers in bringing the various cases to trial during the course of the story.

Plot summary

Fresh from his trip to Britannia, Marcus Didius Falco needs to re-establish himself back in Rome. A minor role in the trial of a senator entangles him in the machinations of two lawyers: Silus Italicus and Paccius Africanus, both ex-consuls with notorious reputations.

The senator is convicted, but then dies, apparently by suicide. Silius hires Falco and his young associates – Aelianus and Justinus – to prove that it was murder, not an attempt to protect his heirs from further legal action. However, probing this tangle of upper-class secrets leads to fresh prosecutions. Falco finds himself in the role of advocate, exposing himself to powerful elements in Roman law. If he offends the wrong people, it might lead to charges he has not bargained for and ruin his family financially.

Characters

Family and associates
 Aulus Camillus Aelianus – Elder of Helena's brothers
 Albia – British girl adopted by Helena
 Anacrites – Chief Spy
 Decimus Camillus Verus – Father of Helena
 Geminus – Father of Falco, Auctioneer
 Glaucus – Falco's trainer
 Helena Justina – Wife of Falco, eldest child, and only daughter of the Senator Decimus Camillus Verus
 Julia Junilla and Sosia Favonia – Daughters of Falco and Helena
 Julia Justa – Mother of Helena
 Junia – Falco's sister
 Junilla Tacita – Mother of Falco
 Lucius Petronius Longus – Friend of Falco and Vigiles Officer
 Maia Favonia – Falco's widowed sister
 Marcus Didius Falco – Informer and Imperial Agent
 Quintus Camillus Justinus – Youngest brother of Helena
 Scythax – Vigiles doctor
 Verontius – Falco's brother-in-law

From the legal world
 Aufustius – Banker
 Biltis – Professional mourner
 Bratta – Informer
 C. Paccius Africanus – Lawyer
 Celadus – Steward
 Claudius Tiasus – Funeral director
 Euboule – Wet-nurse
 Euphanes – Herbalist
 Honorius – Lawyer
 Julius Alexander – Land agent
 Marponius – Judge
 Olympia – Fortune teller
 Perseus – Door porter
 Procreus – Accuser
 Rhoemetalces – Apothecary
 Scorpus – Wills expert
 Spindex – Funeral clown
 Ti Catius Silus Italicus – Lawyer
 Ursulina Prisca – Client
 Zeuko – Daughter of Euboule

Major themes
 The legal machinations of two lawyers.

Allusions/references to history
 Set in Rome in AD 75 and 76, during the reign of Emperor Vespasian.
 Roman law  is the legal  system of ancient Rome. The development of Roman law covers more than one thousand years from the law of the twelve tables (from 449 BC) to the Corpus Juris Civilis  of Emperor Justinian I (around 530). Roman law as preserved in Justinian's codes became the basis of legal practice in the Byzantine Empire and—later—in continental Europe.

Release details
 2003, UK, Century Hardback..
 2004, UK, Arrow, Paperback. .
 2004, US, Mysterious Press, Hardback. .

References

External links 
lindseydavis.co.uk Author's Official Website

2003 British novels
Marcus Didius Falco novels
English historical novels
Historical crime novels
75
76
Century (imprint) books